Timothy Greene is an actor and writer.

Timothy or Tim Greene may also refer to:

Tim Greene, see 2002 Dove Award Nominees

See also
Tim Friese-Greene 
Timothy Green (disambiguation)